Events in the year 1962 in Turkey.

Parliament
 12th Parliament of Turkey

Incumbents
President – Cemal Gürsel
Prime Minister – İsmet İnönü
Leader of the opposition
Ekrem Alican (up to 25 June)
 Ragıp Gümüşpala (from 25 June)

Ruling party and the main opposition
  Ruling party – Republican People's Party (CHP) (up to 25 June with Justice Party (AP), and then with New Turkey Party (YTP) and Republican Villagers Nation Party (CKMP)
  Main opposition 
 New Turkey Party (YTP) (up tp 25 June)
 Justice Party (AP) (from 25 June)

Cabinet
26th government of Turkey (up to 25 June)
27th government of Turkey (from 25 June)

Events
22 February – Coup attempt led by Colonel Talat Aydemir fails.
22 May – Crisis in the government concerning amnesty law
27 May – First Nuclear (test) reactor of Turkey in Küçükçekmece, a suburb of Istanbul
15 June – When most of CKMP members voted to participate in the new government, Osman Bölükbaşı, the chairman of the Party, resigns and founds another party Nation Party (MP)
16 June – Galatasaray won the championship of Turkish football league.
26 August – U.S. vice president Lyndon B. Johnson visits Turkey.

Births
20 February – Hatice Aslan, theatre actress
3 April – Taner Yıldız, politician
7 July – Sırrı Süreyya Önder, film director and politician
12 September – Sunay Akın, journalist and TV host
14 September Nihat Ergün, politician

Deaths
24 January – Ahmet Hamdi Tanpınar (aged 61), novelist
22 March – Hüsrev Gerede (aged 78), retired officier, diplomat and politician
27 August – Reşit Süreyya Gürsey (aged 73), MD, scientist and poet 
14 September – Fuat Bulca (aged 81), retired officer and politician

Gallery

See also
 1961–62 Milli Lig

References

 
Years of the 20th century in Turkey
Turkey
Turkey
Turkey